Breitkopf & Härtel is the world's oldest music publishing house. The firm was founded in 1719 in Leipzig by Bernhard Christoph Breitkopf.

The catalogue currently contains over 1,000 composers, 8,000 works and 15,000 music editions or books on music. The name "Härtel" was added when Gottfried Christoph Härtel took over the company in 1795. In 1807, Härtel began to manufacture pianos, an endeavour which lasted until 1870. The Breitkopf pianos were highly esteemed in the 19th century by pianists like Franz Liszt and Clara Schumann.

In the 19th century the company was for many years the publisher of the Allgemeine musikalische Zeitung, an influential music journal.

The company has consistently supported contemporary composers and had close editorial collaboration with Beethoven, Haydn, Mendelssohn, Schumann, Chopin, Liszt, Wagner and Brahms. In the 19th century they also published the first "complete works" editions of various composers, for instance Bach (the Bach-Gesellschaft edition), Mozart (the Alte Mozart-Ausgabe), and Schubert (the Franz Schubert's Werke). This tradition continues today with prominent contemporary composers. 

The firm was on the board of directors of the Händel-Gesellschaft in 1858.

Archives
Archival materials of the publishing house form the fonds 21081 Breitkopf & Härtel in the State Archives in Leipzig (part of the Saxon State Archives, in German Sächsisches Staatsarchiv).

See also
Johann Gottlob Immanuel Breitkopf
Breitkopf Fraktur - a font invented by Johann Gottlob Immanuel Breitkopf

References

External links 

 
 Music for the Eyes - From the Music Catalogue of Breitkopf & Härtel
 "A Dictionary of Music and Musicians/Breitkopf and Härtel" (Grove, 1900)
 
 
 Breitkopf & Härtel Grand Piano (Leipzig, ca. 1848) - The Piano in Polish Collections (historical instruments)
NAMM Oral History Interview with Head of Sales, Annekathrin Mascus May 1, 2014
NAMM Oral History Interview with Vice President, Dr. Frank Reinisch March 30, 2006 
NAMM Oral History Interview with President, Lieselotte Sievers March 14, 2008

Companies established in 1719
Music publishing companies of Germany
Sheet music publishing companies
Opera publishing companies
Companies based in Wiesbaden
Publishing companies established in the 1710s
Mass media in Leipzig
Mass media in Wiesbaden
1719 establishments in the Holy Roman Empire